Penicillium zhuangii is a fungus species in the genus Penicillium. Described as new to science in 2014, it was isolated from plant leaves in China. It is morphologically similar to Penicillium lividum.

References

zhuangii
Fungi described in 2014
Fungi of Asia